The Glinka Islands are a small group of rocky islands in Lazarev Bay, Antarctica, immediately east of Rothschild Island. They were first photographed from the air by the United States Antarctic Service, 1939–41, and were mapped from air photos taken by the Ronne Antarctic Research Expedition, 1947–48, by D. Searle of the Falkland Islands Dependencies Survey in 1960. They were named by the UK Antarctic Place-Names Committee for Mikhail Ivanovich Glinka, the Russian composer.

See also 
 List of Antarctic and sub-Antarctic islands

References

Islands of Palmer Land
Mikhail Glinka